Edward Herrmann was an American actor of the stage and screen. 

He was most known for his performances as Franklin D. Roosevelt in the limited series Eleanor and Franklin (1976), and Eleanor and Franklin: The White House Years (1977) and as Richard Gilmore in Amy Sherman-Palladino's comedy-drama series Gilmore Girls (2000-2007). 

Herrmann started his career working in theatre on Broadway in 1972 with his debut in Moonchildren alongside James Woods. He received two Tony Award nominations winning for Best Featured Actor in a Play for his performance in Mrs. Warren's Profession in 1976. For his work on television, Herrmann received five Primetime Emmy Award nominations winning for his performance in The Practice in 1999. He also received a Screen Actors Guild Award nomination with the ensemble for Oliver Stone's Nixon (1995). Herrmann became known as a character actor having appeared in various films such as Warren Beatty's Reds (1981), Woody Allen's The Purple Rose of Cairo (1985), Garry Marshall's Overboard (1987), Martin Scorsese's The Aviator (2004) and Chris Rock's I Think I Love My Wife (2007). He is also known for his guest performances in television M*A*S*H, Law & Order, and The Good Wife.

Filmography

Film

Television

Theatre

Video games

References 

Male actor filmographies
American filmographies